Kalybos is the character name of Richard Kweku Asante, a filmmaker and an entrepreneur. He made his acting debut in the comedy video series Boys Kasa in 2012.

Richard Asante popularly known as Kalybos, is a Ghanaian actor and comedian who came to light through his role in the Boys Kasa comic series. In 2017, he and his co-star from the Boys Kasa series Patricia Opoku Agyemang, received a Black British Entertainment Award in London. He has starred in several popular Ghanaian movies including Kalybos in China and Amakye and Dede.

Early life and education
Kalybos was born on April 27, 1988, to Mr. Peter Owusu Mensah and Madam Felicia Owusu. He attended  De-youngsters International and St. Anthony's preparatory school  in Accra for his basic education and had his secondary education at Suhum Secondary Technical School where he studied Building Construction. He furthered at the National Film and Television Institute (NAFTI). Kalybos graduated with a best student honor from NAFTI and with a bachelor's degree in Cinematography .

Filmography
He has starred in several movies, including:

Boys Kasa (2014)
Kalybos In China (2016)
Asylum Down (2016)
Adventures of Kalybos (2018)
Sugar
John and John
Love Language
Maame Hwe
3 Broke Guys
Kobolor
Chocolate City (2018)
A New Flame
The New Adabraka
Okomfo Anokye Poma
Kobolor
Ghaniaja
The 2 Pilots
Ghetto Heros
Kaya
Away Bus (2016)
Think Smart
Mad
Slay (2021)

He also appeared in Conan Without Borders: Ghana with Conan O'Brien in 2019.

Awards

References

External links
 

Living people
Ghanaian actors
Ghanaian comedians
1988 births
Ghanaian male film actors
20th-century Ghanaian male actors